The women's 10 metre platform diving competition at the 2006 Asian Games in Doha was held on 14 December at the Hamad Aquatic Centre.

Schedule
All times are Arabia Standard Time (UTC+03:00)

Results

References 

Results

External links

Diving at the 2006 Asian Games